The MedStar duology is a series of two Star Wars books by Michael Reaves and Steve Perry set during the Clone Wars. Published by Del Rey in 2004, the books take place two years after Star Wars: Episode II – Attack of the Clones, and 21 years before Episode IV: A New Hope.

MedStar I: Battle Surgeons 

The Clone Wars that swept across the galaxy in the twilight years of the Republic engulfed more than Jedi Knights, clone troopers and droid soldiers. On the fierce battlefields of Drongar, a tiny med unit tends to those wounded from the ceaseless combat waged on the jungle world for control of a priceless native plant.

In the pages of this Clone Wars novel, readers will meet a surgeon that cloaks his despair with sardonic wit; another who weathers the death and misery of Drongar by making beautiful music; a compassionate nurse with her heart in her work and her eye on a doctor; and a Jedi Padawan on a healing mission without her Master.

MedStar II: Jedi Healer 

The situation on the far world of Drongar is desperate as Republic forces engage in a fierce fight with the Separatists.
Despite the all-enveloping armor and superior genetic pedigree, the soldiers of the Republic are still flesh and blood. In the steaming jungles of Jasserak, on the planet of Drongar, the doctors and nurses of a small med unit are devoted to patching together the beleaguered troops of the Republic.

This eccentric lot of surgeons is overworked, and even the Jedi healing abilities of Padawan Barriss Offee are tested to the limits. The conflict and casualties continue to grow, and an unthinkable option becomes the inevitable solution to this terrible problem.

External links
Amazon.com Listing
Official CargoBay Listing

2004 American novels
2004 science fiction novels
Star Wars Legends novels
Novels by Michael Reaves
Del Rey books